Elaeocarpus ceylanicus is a species of flowering plant in the Elaeocarpaceae family. It is found only in Sri Lanka.

See also
 List of Elaeocarpus species

References

ceylanicus
Endemic flora of Sri Lanka
Endangered plants
Taxonomy articles created by Polbot